The Treaty of Montreuil provided for the betrothal of Edward of Caernarvon, later King Edward II of England, and Isabella of France, the daughter of Philip IV of France. It was drafted on 19 June, ratified by Edward I on 4 July, and amplified by the Treaty of Chartres on 3 August 1299. Under its terms, should Edward I default on the treaties, he would forfeit Gascony; if Philip defaulted, he would pay a fine of £100,000.

It was said by contemporaries that the alliance brought "great unhappiness to both parties".

The Treaty was negotiated on Edward I's behalf by the Earl of Lincoln, the Earl of Warwick and Amadeus, Count of Savoy. Edward I also privately instructed the Count to enquire about Marguerite of France, whom Edward married soon afterwards.

The final betrothal of Edward of Caernarvon (by then Prince of Wales) and Isabella formed part of the Treaty of Paris (1303) that concluded peace negotiations between England and France. 

Edward II and Isabella of France (the "She-Wolf of France"), who was then aged 12, married at Boulogne-sur-Mer on 25 January 1308.

References

Treaties of medieval England
House of Plantagenet
Treaties of the Kingdom of France
Montreuil
1299 in England
1290s in France
England–France relations